January 26 - Eastern Orthodox liturgical calendar - January 28

All fixed commemorations below are observed on February 9 by Eastern Orthodox Churches on the Old Calendar.

For January 27th, Orthodox Churches on the Old Calendar commemorate the Saints listed on January 14.

Saints
 Venerable Peter of Egypt, disciple of Abba Lot (5th century)
 Saint Marciana the Queen, wife of Emperor Justin I (518-527), interred in the Church of the Holy Apostles.
 Saint Dimitrianos the Wonderworker, Bishop of Tamassos, Cyprus.
 Venerable Claudinus, monastic.
 Saint Elias II, Patriarch of Jerusalem (797)
 Saint Ashot I of Iberia (Ashot Kurapalates), first Bagrationi Prince of Georgia, martyred (830)  (see also: January 29)

Pre-Schism Western saints
 Saint Julian of Sora, martyred under Antoninus Pius (ca. 150) 
 Saint Julian of Le Mans, venerated as the first Bishop of Le Mans in France (3rd century)  (see also: July 13 - East )
 Saint Devota, virgin-martyr in Corsica who expired on the rack in the persecution of Diocletian (303) 
 Saint Avitus, venerated in the Canary Islands as their Apostle and first Bishop, martyred in Africa.
 Saints Datius, Reatrus (Restius) and Companions; and Datius (Dativus), Julian, Vincent and 27 Companions (ca. 500)
 Saint Maurus (Marius, Maur, May), founder of a monastery in Bodon (Bobacum) in France (ca. 555)
 Saint Natalis of Ulster, a monastic founder in the north of Ireland, he worked with St Columba (564)
 Saint Lupus of Châlons, Bishop of Châlons-sur-Saone, famous for his charity to the afflicted (ca. 610)
 Saint Vitalian, Pope of Rome from 657 to 672 (672)
 Saint Emerius, founder and first Abbot of St Stephen of Bañoles in Catalonia in Spain (8th century)
 Saint Candida, mother of St Emerius, anchoress at the monastery of St Stephen of Bañoles in Spain (ca. 798)
 Saint Gamelbert of Michaelsbuch (800)
 Saint Theodoric II of Orleans, monk at Saint-Pierre-le-Vif in Sens in France, became Bishop of Orleans (1022)

Post-Schism Orthodox saints
 Venerable Titus the Soldier, monk of the Kiev Caves Monastery (11th century)
 New Martyr Demetrius at Constantinople (1784)
 Saint Demetrius Klepinine, Priest, of Paris (1944)

New martyrs and confessors
 New Hieromartyr Peter (Zverev) of Voronezh (1929)
 New Hieromartyr Paul Dobromislov, Protopresbyter of Alma-Ata (1940)
 Saint Anna Ivashkina, the Confessor of Ryazan (1948)
 Venerable Leonty (Stasevich) of Ivanovo, Archimandrite, New-Confessor (1972)
 New Hieromartyr Leontius the Mystic of Ternopil and Jablechna monastery, Poland (1972)

Other commemorations
 Translation of the relics (438) of St. John Chrysostom, Archbishop of Constantinople (407)
 Repose of Nun Neonilla of the Farther Davidov Convent (1875)
 Repose of Schema-nun Margarita (Lakhtionova) of Diveyevo Monastery (1997)

Icon gallery

Notes

References

Sources
 January 27 / February 9. Orthodox Calendar (PRAVOSLAVIE.RU).
 February 9 / January 27. HOLY TRINITY RUSSIAN ORTHODOX CHURCH (A parish of the Patriarchate of Moscow).
 January 27. OCA - The Lives of the Saints.
 The Autonomous Orthodox Metropolia of Western Europe and the Americas (ROCOR). St. Hilarion Calendar of Saints for the year of our Lord 2004. St. Hilarion Press (Austin, TX). p. 10.
 January 27. Latin Saints of the Orthodox Patriarchate of Rome.
 The Roman Martyrology. Transl. by the Archbishop of Baltimore. Last Edition, According to the Copy Printed at Rome in 1914. Revised Edition, with the Imprimatur of His Eminence Cardinal Gibbons. Baltimore: John Murphy Company, 1916. pp. 27–28.
 Rev. Richard Stanton. A Menology of England and Wales, or, Brief Memorials of the Ancient British and English Saints Arranged According to the Calendar, Together with the Martyrs of the 16th and 17th Centuries. London: Burns & Oates, 1892. pp. 37–38.
Greek Sources
 Great Synaxaristes:  27 ΙΑΝΟΥΑΡΙΟΥ. ΜΕΓΑΣ ΣΥΝΑΞΑΡΙΣΤΗΣ.
  Συναξαριστής. 27 Ιανουαρίου. ECCLESIA.GR. (H ΕΚΚΛΗΣΙΑ ΤΗΣ ΕΛΛΑΔΟΣ). 
Russian Sources
  9 февраля (27 января). Православная Энциклопедия под редакцией Патриарха Московского и всея Руси Кирилла (электронная версия). (Orthodox Encyclopedia - Pravenc.ru).
  27 января (ст.ст.) 9 февраля 2013 (нов. ст.). Русская Православная Церковь Отдел внешних церковных связей. (DECR).

January in the Eastern Orthodox calendar